John Patrick Croxall  (born 19 January 1946 in Birmingham) is a British biologist, and was Head of Conservation Biology at the British Antarctic Survey.
He is Chair of Global Seabird Programme, of BirdLife International.

Life
Croxall completed a PhD at the University of Auckland in 1971, on ascidian ecology. He was senior research associate in zoology, at the University of Newcastle upon Tyne from 1972 to 1975. He won a Scientific Medal in 1984, from the Zoological Society of London. He received a President’s Medal from the British Ecological Society.

References

British biologists
Fellows of the Royal Society
Academics of Newcastle University
Living people
Commanders of the Order of the British Empire
Scientists from Birmingham, West Midlands
1946 births
University of Auckland alumni